The 2021 Volta a Portugal (known as the 2021 Volta a Portugal em Bicicleta Santander for sponsorship reasons) was the 82nd edition of the Volta a Portugal road cycling stage race (not counting 2020 Volta a Portugal Edição Especial), which was held from 4 to 15 August 2021. It was a 2.1 event on the 2021 UCI Europe Tour calendar.

Summary 
Before the beginning of stage 3,  retired from the race due to covid-19 positive tests among their riders.
In the end of that same stage,  reached the top of individual general classification with Daniel Freitas. However in the following morning another positive test to covid-19 to one of its riders, dictated the withdraw from the race for the team, with Alejandro Marque wearing again the yellow jersey.

Teams 
One UCI WorldTeam, six UCI ProTeams, and eleven UCI Continental teams made up the eighteen teams that participated in the race. Each team entered a squad of seven riders, for a total of 126 riders who started the race. 88 riders finished.

UCI WorldTeams

 

UCI ProTeams

 
 
 
 
 
 

UCI Continental Teams

Schedule

Stages

Prologue 
4 August 2021 — Lisbon,  (ITT)

Stage 1 
5 August 2021 — Torres Vedras to Setúbal,

Stage 2 
6 August 2021 — Ponte de Sor to Castelo Branco,

Stage 3 
7 August 2021 — Sertã to Covilhã (Torre),

Stage 4 
8 August 2021 — Belmonte to Guarda,

Stage 5 
10 August 2021 — Águeda to Santo Tirso (Santuário de Nossa Senhora da Assunção),

Stage 6 
11 August 2021 — Viana do Castelo to Fafe,

Stage 7 
12 August 2021 — Felgueiras to Bragança,

Stage 8 
13 August 2021 — Bragança to Montalegre (Serra do Larouco),

Stage 9 
14 August 2021 — Boticas to Mondim de Basto (Santuário de Nossa Senhora da Graça),

Stage 10 
15 August 2021 — Viseu to Viseu,  (ITT)

Classification leadership table 

 On stage 2, Alex Molenaar, who was second in the points classification, wore the green jersey, because first-placed Rafael Reis wore the yellow jersey as the leader of the general classification. For the same reason, Ben King will wear the green jersey on stage 8.
 On stage 4, Hugo Nunes, who was second in the mountains classification, wore the polka dot jersey, because first-placed Alejandro Marque wore the yellow jersey as the leader of the general classification.
 Before stage 6, the team of general classification leader Daniel Freitas, withdrew due to a suspected COVID-19 case within the team. As a result, on stage 6, second-placed Alejandro Marque wore the yellow jersey.

Final classification standings

General classification

Points classification

Mountains classification

Young rider classification

Portuguese rider classification

Combination classification

Team classification

References

Sources

External links 
  
 ProCyclingStats

2021
Volta a Portugal
Volta a Portugal
Volta a Portugal